Yunjin Kim (Hangul: 김윤진), also known as Kim Yun-Jin (born November 7, 1973) is a South Korean-American film and theater actress. She is best known for her role as Sun-Hwa Kwon on the American television series Lost, and as the North Korean spy Bang-Hee in the South Korean film Shiri. She also starred as Dr. Karen Kim in the ABC drama series  Mistresses.

Early life
Kim was born in Seoul, South Korea. She immigrated to the United States with her family in 1983-1984. They lived in Staten Island, New York. She joined the middle school drama club in the 7th grade and performed in the musical My Fair Lady.

Kim attended high school at the prestigious Fiorello H. LaGuardia High School of Music & Art and Performing Arts, a public high school located in Manhattan. From there, she went on to study drama at the London Academy of Performing Arts and later earned her BFA degree in drama at Boston University. Kim has remarked that in her zeal to become Americanized quickly, she studied acting, academics and pronunciation with equal intensity. She is also a trained dancer and martial arts fighter.

Career
After graduation, Kim devoted herself full-time to acting. She garnered several minor parts on MTV, in soap opera-style dramas on ABC, and on the off-Broadway stage. In 1997, she starred in Splendid Holiday, a Korean TV drama shot on location in New York. Kim decided to return to Korea. She was cast in the TV drama Wedding Dress and was also invited to act in Lee Kwangmo's feature Spring in My Hometown, although she ended up not taking this role. Her breakthrough debut came in the 1999 film Shiri, South Korea's first blockbuster film. Shiri became the highest-grossing film in Korean history at the time. In November 2000, she continued her association with Kang Je-gyu in The Legend of Gingko.

After acting in a Japanese film and a feature set in Los Angeles, Kim appeared in the sci-fi feature Yesterday. Then in 2002, Kim took the lead role in Ardor, the feature film debut of documentarist Byun Young-ju. The film was invited to screen in a non-competitive section at the 2003 Berlin film festival.

In 2004, Kim started appearing in the U.S. television series Lost, which ran for six seasons.

In May 2006, Maxim named Kim number 98 on its annual Hot 100 List. In October 2006 she was featured on the cover of Stuff, as well as an inside spread.

In 2013, she had a leading role in the ABC drama series Mistresses.

In 2018, Kim returned to Korean television by headlining the series Ms. Ma, Nemesis.

In 2022, she starred as Seon Woo-jin in the korean remake of Money Heist, Money Heist: Korea - Joint Economic Area.

Personal life
Kim married her former manager Park Jeong-hyeok in March 2010 on the island of Oahu, after shooting her final scenes for Lost.

Filmography

Film

Television

Video games

Awards and nominations

References

External links 

 
 Official Website

Living people
Actresses from New York City
Actresses from Seoul
American television actresses
Boston University College of Fine Arts alumni
People from Staten Island
South Korean emigrants to the United States
South Korean television actresses
South Korean film actresses
20th-century American actresses
21st-century American actresses
20th-century South Korean actresses
21st-century South Korean actresses
American actresses of Korean descent
American voice actresses
American video game actresses
South Korean video game actresses
South Korean voice actresses
Fiorello H. LaGuardia High School alumni
Alumni of the British American Drama Academy
1973 births